William Lacy Clay Jr. (born July 27, 1956) is an American politician who served as the U.S. representative from  from 2001 to 2021. His congressional career ended after he lost in a Democratic primary to Cori Bush in 2020, after successfully defeating her in the 2018 primary.

The district Clay represented is based in the city of St. Louis and includes most of northern St. Louis County (North County), including the cities of Maryland Heights, University City, Ferguson and Florissant.

Early life and education 
William Lacy Clay Jr. was born in St. Louis, Missouri. His family moved to Washington, D.C., when his father, Bill Clay, was elected to Congress. His mother was Carol Ann (nee Johnson).

In his teenage years, Clay attended public schools in Silver Spring, Maryland, and graduated from Springbrook High School in 1974. He subsequently attended the University of Maryland, College Park, earning a degree in political science and a paralegal certificate. Clay is a member of Kappa Alpha Psi fraternity. He attended Howard University School of Law, worked as an Assistant Doorkeeper of the United States House of Representatives, and worked on his father's Congressional campaigns.

Missouri Legislature
Clay entered the Missouri House of Representatives in 1983, winning a special election to complete the term of Nathaniel J. "Nat" Rivers. In 1991, he was elected to the Missouri Senate.

U.S. House of Representatives
In 2000, Bill Clay announced his retirement after 32 years in Congress. His son, Lacy Clay, faced a three-way Democratic primary to succeed his father. Clay Jr. prevailed with 62% of the vote. He breezed to victory in the general election. He was reelected nine times, winning Democratic primaries by an average margin of 30 points. In ten general elections, Clay Jr. has received an average of 73.5% of the general election vote.

For his first six terms, Clay represented the northern two-thirds of St. Louis, while the southern third was in Missouri's 3rd congressional district, represented by Russ Carnahan. After Missouri lost a congressional district as a result of the 2010 census, the final map resulted in the 3rd district being eliminated and the 1st district absorbing all of St. Louis, a decision in which then-U.S. Senator Claire McCaskill said Clay was involved for his self-interest. Clay beat Carnahan in the August 7, 2012, primary, 63% to 34%.

In the 2018 Democratic primary, he defeated Cori Bush, a Justice Democrat, and two other challengers with 56.7% of the vote. In the general election, Clay beat Republican Robert Vroman with 80% of the vote.

In the 2020 Democratic primary, he lost to Bush, with 45% of the vote to her 48%.

Committee assignments
 Committee on Financial Services
Subcommittee on Housing, Community Development and Insurance (Chairman)
 United States House Committee on Oversight and Reform
 United States House Natural Resources Committee

Caucus memberships
 Congressional Black Caucus
 Congressional Progressive Caucus
United States Congressional International Conservation Caucus
 Congressional Arts Caucus

Capitol painting
In January 2017, Clay argued with Republican lawmakers over the right to hang a controversial painting in the Capitol. The winner of an art competition, the painting represents the violent Ferguson unrest of 2014 and ensuing police-community relations in Ferguson, Missouri, depicting police officers as pigs while apprehending suspects. The painting is displayed near the police security checkpoint. Representative Duncan D. Hunter removed the painting and Clay rehung it. Several Republicans, including Doug Lamborn, Dana Rohrabacher, and Brian Babin, repeatedly removed the painting, and Clay rehung it each time. Clay then attempted to file a complaint with the Capitol Police accusing Hunter of theft. After the architect of the U.S. Capitol ruled that the winning painting had violated the rules of the art competition and ordered its permanent removal, Clay sued to overturn the decision, but his suit was dismissed by a federal judge. Clay continued to assert a First Amendment argument on behalf of his young constituent, asking, "How is it possible that we stand for freedom of speech and freedom of expression every place across this country, except the U.S. Capitol?"

Federal legislation to curb gun violence
In the 116th Congress, Clay introduced HR3435, the Local Public Health and Safety Protection Act, legislation that would, for the first time at the federal level, give local communities the freedom to enact regulations to curb gun violence without seeking permission from their state legislatures. The legislation grants local control over the issue via the Supremacy Clause of the U.S. Constitution and by tying the law to future public safety grant funding to states from the U.S. Department of Justice. Support across the nation for Clay's bill is growing, with endorsements from Moms Demand Action Against Gun Violence, Newtown Action, Giffords Courage, Brady, and many other gun control advocates.

Environment
While in his role as a member of the House Natural Resources Committee, Clay was an advocate for renewable energy, acting on climate change, cosponsoring the Green New Deal, protecting National Parks, national seashores, wildlife refuges, forests, and rivers. He was also an outspoken champion for cleaning up hazardous waste sites in largely minority communities, which are often the victims of environmental racism. Clay led the effort to clean up three dangerous, hazardous sites in his district: $5 million for the former St. Louis Army Ammunition Plant in North St. Louis, $33 million for the former Carter Carburetor plant site in North St. Louis, and $266 million for the radiologically contaminated West Lake Landfill Superfund site in Northwest St. Louis County.

Political positions
During Clay's 17 years in the Missouri legislature, he authored Missouri's Hate Crimes Law, which included gender, sexual orientation and sexual identity in the criteria for what constitutes a hate crime.

He was one of the 31 United States Representatives who voted not to count the electoral votes from Ohio in the 2004 presidential election.

Clay voted against the Emergency Economic Stabilization Act of 2008.

Clay is a supporter of the Federal Reserve's program of quantitative easing, claiming it has led to economic recovery since the financial crisis of 2007–2008.

On December 18, 2019, Clay voted for both articles in the first impeachment of Donald Trump.

Electoral history

Personal life
Clay married his first wife, Ivie, in 1992, when he was a state senator. He filed for divorce in 2009. Ivie initially found out about the divorce "only through the media." Through her lawyer, she stated: "“I and my children are devastated and embarrassed that my husband let us find out from the children’s friends and the media that he had filed for divorce, and mostly that he still has not contacted our children. I would have wanted to prepare the children." The divorce was finalized in 2011.

Clay later remarried and he and his wife, Patricia, reside in University City, in St Louis County, Missouri. He is the father of two children, Carol and Will III.

He is Catholic.

See also
 List of African-American United States representatives

References

External links

 
 
 

|-

1956 births
21st-century American politicians
African-American members of the United States House of Representatives
African-American state legislators in Missouri
African-American people in Missouri politics
Democratic Party members of the United States House of Representatives from Missouri
Living people
Democratic Party members of the Missouri House of Representatives
Democratic Party Missouri state senators
Clay, Lacy
University of Maryland, College Park alumni
African-American Catholics
21st-century African-American politicians
20th-century African-American people